The Pelecanidae is a family of pelecaniform birds within the Pelecani that contains three genera: the extinct Eopelecanus and Miopelecanus and the extant Pelecanus. 

Pelecanids have existed since the late Eocene (Priabonian)and they still exist today.

References

 
Taxa named by Constantine Samuel Rafinesque
Bird families